Ahsanullah Master (9 November 1950 – 7 May 2004) was a Bangladesh Awami League politician and a Jatiya Sangsad member from the Gazipur-2 constituency. He was a notable trade union leader who was assassinated in May 2004. He was awarded Independence Award in 2021 posthumously.

Early life and career
Master completed his bachelor's from the University of Dhaka and started his career in teaching profession. During 1983–1988, he led the Pubail Union Parishad in the Gazipur District. He later served as the chairman of Gazipur Upazila Council.

Master was a member of Mukti Bahini and fought in the Bangladesh Liberation War. He was elected to parliament form Gazipur-2 constituency in 1996 and 2001.

Death
Master was shot dead in a conference along with Omar Faruq Ratan in Tongi, Gazipur on 7 May 2004.

In April 2005, Dhaka Speedy Trial Tribunal-1 convicted Nurul Islam Sarkar, a leader of pro-BNP Bangladesh Jatiotabadi Jubo Dal, and 27 others for the killing, quoting "the lawmaker was killed out of political vindictiveness and for establishing supremacy in the locality". Among the 28 convicted, the court sentenced 22 to death and 6 to life term imprisonment. In June 2016, the High Court, on appeals, confirmed the death penalty of 6, commuted 7 others to life imprisonment, upheld life term sentence of 2 and acquitted 11 of the charges against them. The other 2 had died during the trial.

Personal life
Master's son Zahid Ahsan Russell is the incumbent Jatiya Sangsad member from the same Gazipur-2 constituency since Master's death.

References

1950 births
2004 deaths
People from Gazipur District
University of Dhaka alumni
Awami League politicians
7th Jatiya Sangsad members
8th Jatiya Sangsad members
Assassinated Bangladeshi politicians
People murdered in Bangladesh
Place of birth missing
Deaths by firearm in Bangladesh
Recipients of the Independence Day Award
2004 murders in Bangladesh